Prosopanche is a group of parasitic plants described as a genus in 1868.

It is native to South America and Central America.

Taxonomy
The following species are listed within the genus Prosopanche:
 Prosopanche americana (R.Br.) Baill. - Pasco, N Argentina, S Brazil
 Prosopanche bonacinae Speg. - Argentina, Paraguay, Rio Grande do Sul
 Prosopanche caatingicola R.F.Machado & L.P.Queiroz - Bahia
 Prosopanche costaricensis L.D.Gómez - Costa Rica

References

Aristolochiaceae
Piperales genera
Parasitic plants